The rusty-breasted cuckoo (Cacomantis sepulcralis) is a species of cuckoo in the family Cuculidae.
It is found in Indonesia, Malaysia, the Philippines, Singapore, and Thailand. Its natural habitat is subtropical or tropical moist lowland forests. It is sometimes considered a subspecies of the brush cuckoo.

References

rusty-breasted cuckoo
Birds of Malesia
rusty-breasted cuckoo
Taxonomy articles created by Polbot
Taxobox binomials not recognized by IUCN